The Devon County Football Association, also simply known as the Devon FA, is the governing body of football in the county of Devon. The Devon FA was founded in 1888 in Plymouth.

They run a number of league and cup competitions for teams of all levels across the county, and representative teams for Senior Ladies, Under 18 Men and Under 18 Ladies.

History

The Devon County Football Association was formed in 1888 at a meeting held in the pavilion of Plymouth Cricket Club, South Devon Place, which is now the Astor Playing Fields at Cattedown. The founding clubs were:

 Plymouth F.C.
 Plymouth United
 Argyle FC
 Plymouth College
 Newton
 Carlton Oaks
 Tavistock Grammar School
 Mannamead School

Initially the County FA established a set of rules for members and oversaw friendlies and inter county representative matches. The first County Representative match took place in March 1888 at Weston-super-Mare against Somerset County FA where they were defeated by two goals to nil. The return fixture in April also ended in a defeat by two goals to three. In 1889, the County Cup competition, the Challenge Cup, was inaugurated. The first winners were Tavistock Town who defeated Plymouth FC in the final.

Leagues

Devon is one of the largest County FAs by geographic area. There are five affiliated Saturday men's leagues, one Women's league, four Sunday leagues and a Wednesday league. They are:

Saturday
 Plymouth and West Devon Combination Football League
 South Devon League
 North Devon League
 Devon and Exeter League
 Kingsley League (in recess)

Women's
 Devon Women's League

Sunday
 Exeter and District Sunday League
 Torbay Sunday League
 North Devon Sunday League
 Plymouth and West Devon Sunday League
Devon Wednesday League

Additionally there are 8 Junior Boy's leagues and one Girl's league. Affiliated clubs also play in other Football Association and Football League competitions. These include the three senior clubs that play in Football League Two (as of 2013) of Plymouth Argyle, Exeter City and Torquay United.

County Cups

The Devon St Lukes Challenge Cup is the senior county knockout cup competition. Other cup competitions include:

 St Lukes Challenge Cup
 Devon Premier Cup
 Devon Senior Cup
 Devon Intermediate Cup
 Devon Veterans Cup
 Devon Midweek Cup
 Devon Sunday Supplementary Cup
 Devon Under 13 Boys Cup
 Devon Under 14 Boys Cup
 Devon Under 15 Boys Cup
 Devon Under 16 Boys Cup
 Devon Under 18 Youth Cup
 Devon Women's Senior Cup
 Devon Women's Supplementary Cup
 Devon Under 13 Girls Cup
 Devon Under 15 Girls Cup
 Devon Under 16 Girls Cup

References

External links
 Devon FA's official site

County football associations
Football in Devon
Sports organizations established in 1888